In chemistry, an imidic acid is any molecule that contains the -C(=NH)-OH functional group. It is the tautomer of an amide and the isomer of an oxime.

The term "imino acid" is an obsolete term for this group that should not be used in this context because it has a different molecular structure.

Imidic acids can be formed by metal-catalyzed dehydrogenation of geminal amino alcohols. For example, methanolamine, the parent compound of the amino alcohols, can be dehydrogenated to methanimidic acid, the parent compound of the imidic acids.

H2NCH2OH → HNCHOH + H2 (tautomer of formamide)

Geminal amino alcohols with side chains similarly form imidic acids with the same side chains:

H2NCHROH → HNCROH + H2

Another way to form imidic acids is the reaction of carboxylic acids with azanone. For example, the reaction for carbamic acid:

H2NCOOH + HNO → H2NCNHOH + O2 (tautomer of urea)

And the general reaction for substituted imidic acids:

RCOOH + R'NO → RCNR'OH + O2

Another mechanism is the reaction of carboxylic acids with diazene or other azo compounds, forming azanone.

RCOOH + HNNH → RCNHOH + HNO

Imidic acids tautomerize to amides by a hydrogen shift from the oxygen to the nitrogen atom. Amides are more stable in an environment with oxygen or water, whereas imidic acids dominate the equilibrium in solution with ammonia or methane.

HNCHOH ⇌ HCONH2

RNCR'OH ⇌ R'CONHR

See also 
 Imidate
 Alkanolamine
 Hemiaminal

References 

Amides
Functional groups